The murder of Seth Smith occurred on June 15, 2020. The 19-year-old University of California, Berkeley student Smith was shot in the back of the head at point-blank range.

Days after Smith was killed, 60-year-old Tony Lorenzo Walker was identified as a suspect. After a lengthy investigation, Berkeley police arrested Walker on August 20, 2020, on suspicion of Smith's homicide.

On May 23, 2022, Walker was convicted in the fatal shooting of Smith and sentenced to 25 years in prison, pleading no contest to voluntary manslaughter as part of a plea deal.

Background

Seth Smith
19-year-old Smith was a third-year student pursuing a double major in economics and history at Berkeley.

Tony Lorenzo Walker
Walker, 60-years-old at the time of the shooting, "had at least 11 prior convictions in Alameda County, including several second-degree robberies, burglaries and a commercial burglary ranging from the 1970s to 1990s, an armed robbery in 1992, assault with a deadly weapon in 2001 and possession of a firearm by a prohibited person in 2016."

Reaction
On June 6, 2022, Tucker Carlson, on his Fox News show Tucker Carlson Tonight, discussed the murder of Seth Smith, describing it as a "racially motivated attack". He cited the fact that the Department of Justice did not pursue hate crime charges and the voluntary manslaughter plea deal as a case of "politicized law enforcement".

References

2020 murders in the United States
Deaths by firearm in California
June 2020 crimes in the United States